Kef Governorate is one of the twenty-four governorates of Tunisia. It comprises chiefly part of the dorsal Atlas Mountains and their foothills in north-western Tunisia, bordering Algeria. It covers an area of 4,965 km2 and has a population of 243,156 (2014 census). The capital is El Kef.

Administrative divisions
Twelve municipalities are in Kef Governorate:

Demographics
Due to its close proximity to the Algerian border and its historical role in the Algerian War of Independence, Kef has a significant Algerian population, hosting over 6,000 registered Algerian voters, the second largest such community in Tunisia after Tunis. Its capital city, El Kef, was the command centre of the Front de Libération Nationale during the Algerian War of Independence against the French in the 1950s.

References

 
Governorates of Tunisia